Mitch Palmer (born September 2, 1973) is a former American football linebacker. He played for the Tampa Bay Buccaneers from 1998 to 1999 and for the Minnesota Vikings in 2000.

References

1973 births
Living people
American football linebackers
Colorado State Rams football players
Tampa Bay Buccaneers players
Minnesota Vikings players